Deh-e Davud (also Romanized as Deh-e Dāvūd; also known as Deh Dāūd and Deh Dāvod) is a village in Hendudur Rural District, Sarband District, Shazand County, Markazi Province, Iran. At the 2006 census, its population was 283, in 79 families.

References 

Populated places in Shazand County